This is an overview of the 2020 Iranian legislative election in Tehran, Rey, Shemiranat and Eslamshahr electoral district. In the election, all 30 seats were decided in the first round and went to the unity list jointly endorsed by the Coalition Council of Islamic Revolution Forces and the Front of Islamic Revolution Stability.

Turnout 
The election was noted being held two days after acknowledgement of COVID-19 spread in Iran, as well as for its low turnout, which was the lowest nationwide amidst the lowest national turnout for decades. The turnout was interpreted as a possible sign of apathy and widespread dissatisfaction with the establishment.

Official turnout in the constituency was put at 25.4% by the interior minister Abdolreza Rahmani Fazli, who was quoted by the AP as saying "we believe that the number of votes and the turnout is absolutely acceptable". Ali Motahari, an outgoing MP for the constituency, expressed his regret that only 18% of eligible voters in the city of Tehran had showed up at the polling place, of whom 8% had cast spoilt ballots.

Results

Notes and references

Parliamentary elections in Tehran
2020s in Tehran
2020 elections in Iran